Gonzalo Slipak is an Argentine actor.

Awards

Nominations
 2013 Martín Fierro Awards
 Best new actor or actress

References

Argentine male actors
Living people
Year of birth missing (living people)
Place of birth missing (living people)